Léon Lhoist was a Belgian businessman. In 1889 Hippolyte Dumont, his father-in-law, established the Carrières et Fours à Chaux Dumont-Wautier, at Hermalle in Belgium. In 1924, Léon Lhoist founded the Etablissements Léon Lhoist, a lime and dolime (dolomitic lime, or burnt dolomite) producer, at Jemelle, Belgium. In 1926, Lhoist established the Carrières et Fours à Chaux de Dugny in France.

Sources
 De vijfentwintig rijkste Vlamingen: brouwers boven
 Lhoist group history

Belgian businesspeople